Ayta Sözeri (born 31 March 1976) is a Turkish actress, singer and LGBT activist.

Biography 
Sözeri was born on 31 March 1976 in West Germany. Her mother was of Circassian descent. Her family settled in İzmir in 1982 and she underwent sex reassignment surgery at the age of 20. She graduated from the Ege University Business Administration Department and took Turkish classical music at Dokuz Eylül University. Later she started performing as a backing vocalist for a number of artists, including Sezen Aksu.

Filmography

Discography 
Singles
 "Büklüm Büklüm" (2018)
 "Yanayım Yanayım" (2018)
 "Gülü Susuz Seni Aşksız Bırakmam" (Aşkın'ın Şarkıları) (2019)
 "Rustik" (ft. Uraz Kaygılaroğlu) (Eltilerin Savaşı soundtrack) (2020)
 "Anılarıma Yazık" (2020)

Awards 
 50th Cinema Writers Association Awards, Best Supporting Actress Performance, Aile Arasında, 2018

References

External links 
 

1976 births
Living people
Turkish television actresses
Turkish film actresses
Turkish people of Circassian descent
Turkish LGBT actors
Turkish LGBT singers
Turkish LGBT rights activists
Turkish transgender people
Transgender women
21st-century Turkish women singers
21st-century Turkish LGBT people